U.S. Route 70 (US 70) enters the state of Tennessee from Arkansas via the Memphis & Arkansas Bridge in Memphis, and runs west to east across 21 counties in all three Grand Divisions of Tennessee, with a total length of , to end at the North Carolina state line in eastern Cocke County. Along the route, US 70 is accompanied with various U.S. and state highways, including those in three of the state's four major cities (e.g. Memphis, Nashville, and Knoxville).

Route description

Memphis to Nashville
US 70 enters the state via the Memphis & Arkansas Bridge on I-55, along with U.S. Routes 61, 64, and 79, along with SR 1. US 70 follows E.H. Crump Avenue, Danny Thomas Boulevard, Union Avenue, East Parkway, and Summer Avenue through Memphis, mostly accompanied with US 64 and US 79, along with some of SR 3.

While US 64 departs from US 70/79 in Bartlett, US 79 remains with US 70 from there to Brownsville, in Haywood County. US 70 turns eastward to go through the cities of Jackson, Huntingdon, and Camden before crossing the Tennessee River. After that, it then continues eastward through Waverly, Dickson, and Kingston Springs before making entry into Nashville.

Much of US 70 from Memphis to the west side of Nashville is accompanied by the secret designation of Tennessee State Route 1, with the exception of a few streets in downtown Memphis. US 70 has two concurrencies with SR 1 in the western half of the state, one in the downtown area, and the other from the east side of Memphis to western Davidson County. The brief one in downtown Nashville is the third SR 1 concurrency along with US 70S/US 431 along Broadway.

Nashville area

In Nashville, US 70 begins to be paired with SR 24 after lending SR 1 to the Memphis-Bristol Highway (U.S. Route 70S). US 70 continues into downtown Nashville, following Charlotte Avenue, 14th Avenue (13th Avenue for US 70's westbound lanes along I-40/I-65), Broadway, First Avenue, and Hermitage Avenue. At the 14th Avenue intersection on Charlotte Avenue, US 70 acts as collector/distributor roads for I-40/I-65 for two blocks before joining U.S. 431 and U.S. 70S on a brief overlap.

After US 431 and US 70S splits from the main route on Broadway, US 70 progresses eastward, roughly paralleling the Cumberland River, ducking under the western split of I-40 and I-24, and continuing to an interchange with SR 155 (Briley Parkway) east of downtown, and then Old Hickory Boulevard in Hermitage.

Mount Juliet to Lenoir City
East of Nashville, US 70 enters Wilson County near Mount Juliet. US 70 then bypasses the downtown area of Lebanon with intersections with US 231 (SR 10) and US 70N (SR 24), and including a concurrency with SR 141 before turning southeast to DeKalb and White Counties. US 70 is paired with Tennessee State Route 26 from Lebanon all the way to the state route's terminus in Sparta. Near the US 70S junction in Sparta, SR 1 returns to US 70 for its route from there, to Crossville, to the Harriman/Kingston area, all the way into the north side of Lenoir City, and after US 11 (SR 2) joins US 70, it eventually enters the Knoxville area.

Knoxville to the North Carolina border
In downtown Knoxville, US 70, along with US 11, follows Neyland Drive, south of the campus of University of Tennessee, then exits onto Hall of Fame Drive north to Magnolia Avenue. US 11/70 follows Magnolia Avenue out of downtown. At the US 11W/11E split, US 70 begins to follow US 11E, while SR 1 follows US 11W. Before crossing the Tennessee River for a second time, US 25W begins to follow US 70 (SR 9) from the east side of Knoxville until it merges with US 25E at Newport. US 70 carries US 25 into North Carolina east of Newport.

Major intersections
The mileposts listed in the following table is only an estimated calculation. Actual mile markers may vary.

Related routes

Supplemental routes
 
U.S. Route 70 Business (Huntingdon, Tennessee)
U.S. Route 70 Business (Camden, Tennessee)
Tennessee State Route 391
U.S. Route 70 Business (Dickson, Tennessee)
Tennessee State Route 325
U.S. Route 70 Business (Lebanon, Tennessee)

Tennessee State Route 1

Tennessee State Route 9

Tennessee State Route 26
 

State Route 26 (SR 26) runs concurrently with US 70 for its entire existence through Wilson, De Kalb and White Counties in Middle Tennessee.

History
It was signed solely as SR 26 until sometime in the 1960s or 1970s when US 70 was designated on that alignment, but retains the state route designation as a secret, or hidden designation.

See also

Roads in Memphis, Tennessee
Roads in Nashville, Tennessee
Tennessee State Route 1 
Tennessee State Route 9 
Tennessee State Route 24 
Tennessee State Route 76

References

External links

 Tennessee
070
Tennessee State Route 1
Transportation in Shelby County, Tennessee
Transportation in Fayette County, Tennessee
Transportation in Tipton County, Tennessee
Transportation in Haywood County, Tennessee
Transportation in Carroll County, Tennessee
Transportation in Benton County, Tennessee
Transportation in Humphreys County, Tennessee
Transportation in Dickson County, Tennessee
Transportation in Cheatham County, Tennessee
Transportation in Nashville, Tennessee
Transportation in Davidson County, Tennessee
Transportation in Wilson County, Tennessee
Transportation in DeKalb County, Tennessee
Transportation in White County, Tennessee
Transportation in Cumberland County, Tennessee
Transportation in Roane County, Tennessee
Transportation in Loudon County, Tennessee
Transportation in Knox County, Tennessee
Transportation in Knoxville, Tennessee
Transportation in Sevier County, Tennessee
Transportation in Jefferson County, Tennessee
Transportation in Cocke County, Tennessee
Transportation in Memphis, Tennessee